Wolpert is a surname. People with this surname include:

 Ann Wolpert (1943-2013), American pioneer in digital libraries
 Daniel Wolpert (born 1963), British neuroscientist
 David Wolpert, American mathematician, physicist, and computer scientist.
 Gavin Wolpert, Canadian-American bridge player
 James Wolpert (born 1990), American singer
 Jay Wolpert, American television producer
 Jenny Wolpert, Swedish-American bridge player
 Julian Wolpert (born 1932), American geographer
 Larry Wolpert (born 1956), American politician 
 Lewis Wolpert (born 1929), British developmental biologist
 Ludwig Yehuda Wolpert (1900–1981), Israeli-American goldsmith and designer
 Miranda Wolpert, British psychologist
 Scott A. Wolpert, American mathematician
 Stanley Wolpert (1927–2019), American historian and Indologist

See also 
 Hans Wölpert (1898–1957), German weightlifter